Savichev is a Russian surname. Notable people with the surname include:

 Daniil Savichev (born 1994), Russian footballer
 Nikolai Savichev (born 1965), Soviet and Russian footballer and coach
 Yulia Savicheva (born 1987) Russian singer
 Yuri Savichev (born 1965), Soviet and Russian footballer and coach

Russian-language surnames